Lidia Mikhailovna Yermoshina ( Lidziya Mikhaylauna Yarmoshyna;  Lidiya Mikhaylovna Ermoshina; born 29 January 1953) is a Belarusian politician. She was a member of the Central Election Commission of Belarus (1992–1996), and Chairwoman (1996–2021).

Biography
Yermoshina was born in Slutsk, Minsk Voblast on 29 January 1953.
In 1975, she graduated from the Faculty of Law at the Immanuel Kant Baltic Federal University. Beginning in 1975, she worked as a legal advisor until becoming an attorney's assistant in 1987. She became Chairwoman of the Judiciary of the City Executive Committee of Babruysk in 1988, a post she held until 1996.

Belarusian elections
She has been a member of the Central Election Commission of Belarus since 1992, and Chairwoman of the organization since 1996. She was appointed by decree by Alexander Lukashenko in contradiction with the Constitution of Belarus, which stated that the candidacy of the Chairman of the CEC must be approved by the Supreme Council of Belarus. The previous Chairman, Viktar Hanchar, had been an active critic of the 1996 Belarusian referendum and was removed by Lukashenko after serving just little over a month.

In 2004, following the 2004 Belarusian parliamentary election and constitutional referendum, Yermoshina was banned from entering the European Union for allegedly participating in the manipulation of the results of the presidential election. Following the same accusations, in 2006, the United States included her in the sanction list as well. The ban was lifted in 2008.

On 15 December 2010, presidential candidate Andrei Sannikov logged a legal complaint application to the Central Election Commission of Belarus, demanding they remove Yermoshyna from her office as Chairperson of the Central Election Commission. He cited that her position was illegal, as Yermoshyna was a member of incumbent Aleksandr Lukashenko's political team, compromising her neutrality, and was under international scrutiny for purportedly rigging the previous election. The complaints were ineffective. Yermoshina was again sanctioned by the European Union in the aftermath of the 2010 election; these sanctions were suspended in 2015 and lifted in 2016.

On 9 August 2020, Yermoshina appeared on Belarusian TV to condemn the "deliberate provocations" of protest voters in the 2020 Belarusian presidential election. She also described long queues outside polling stations as an attempt at "sabotage" by the opposition.

Independent observers of the election have noted vote counting irregularities and dozens have been subject to harassment and detention. U.S. Secretary of State Mike Pompeo described the elections as "neither free nor fair." After the election and the subsequent protests, Yermoshina was banned from entering the European Union, the United Kingdom, Switzerland and Canada.

Yermoshina was replaced by the former Minister of Education  on 13 December 2021.

Personal life
Lidia Yermoshina has been divorced twice, and has a son who died at age 40 of unknown causes in June 2016.

See also
1996 Belarusian referendum
2006 Belarusian presidential election
2010 Belarusian presidential election

References

External links
Who is who in Belarus 

1953 births
Living people
People from Slutsk
Belarusian people of Ukrainian descent
20th-century Belarusian women politicians
20th-century Belarusian politicians
Immanuel Kant Baltic Federal University alumni
Members of election commissions
Belarusian individuals subject to the U.S. Department of the Treasury sanctions
Specially Designated Nationals and Blocked Persons List
21st-century Belarusian women politicians
21st-century Belarusian politicians